Madi Anne Davis (born January 23, 1999) is an American singer-songwriter, who was a contestant on NBC's The Voice. She was a semi-finalist season nine and the longest-standing member of team Pharrell Williams. Her song, "Girls Just Want to Have Fun", performed on the show, charted on the Billboard magazine Hot 100 chart.

Early and personal life
Madi Anne Davis was born on January 23, 1999, in McKinney, Texas.

Music career

The Voice (Jun-Dec 2015)
Her music career started in 2015, with her appearance on season nine of NBC's The Voice, where she got a two chair turn during the auditions, when she chose to be part of Pharrell Williams's team on the show. Her rendition, "Girls Just Want to Have Fun", charted on the Billboard magazine Hot 100 chart, at No. 98.

 – Studio version of performance reached the top 10 on iTunes

References

External links
 Madi Davis The Voice artist profile
 Madi Davis Webpage www.madiannedavis.com
 Madi Davis Madi Davis Twitter

1999 births
Living people
Republic Records artists
Songwriters from Texas
Singers from Texas
The Voice (franchise) contestants
People from McKinney, Texas
21st-century American singers